Abu Tahsin al-Salihi (1 July 1953 – 29 September 2017) was an Iraqi veteran sniper. A volunteer in the Iraqi Popular Mobilization Forces, he is credited with killing over 384 ISIS members during the War in Iraq (2013–2017), receiving the nicknames "The Sheikh of Snipers" and "Hawk Eye."

Before the War in Iraq (2013–2017), al-Salihi fought in the Yom Kippur War, the Iran–Iraq War, the invasion of Kuwait, the Gulf War, and the 2003 US invasion of Iraq. According to al-Salihi, in the Yom Kippur War he was part of an Iraqi brigade fighting on Golan Heights. Around May 2015 al-Salihi joined the Popular Mobilization Forces and was stationed in the Makhoul Mountains in northern Iraq, armed with a Steyr anti materiel rifle. Al-Salihi began fighting ISIS in Jurf Al Nasr. He was trained in his sniper skills by the Russian military.

Early life
Abu Tahsin al-Salihi was born Ali Jiyad Obaid al-Salihi and was known by his nom de guerre The Hawk Eye or teknonym Abu Tahsin. He was born in 1953, had eleven children, five girls and six boys. He was a Shia Muslim. He traveled to Kuwait in the 1970s and worked many jobs there, two of which were being a shepherd of cows and camels. He had a French rifle to protect himself and with which he hunted rabbits, from this he gained knowledge in hunting and shooting.

Military career
Months before the Ramadan War in the 1970s, he was nominated to travel to Belarus to train in a course and took second place. The first war he fought in was the Ramadan War in 1973, where he was stationed in the Golan Heights in the 5th mountainous brigade. The second war he fought in was the Second Kurdish–Iraqi War in 1974. From the start of the uprising until 2014, he joined the Sadr brigade where he participated in the liberation of many provinces in Iraq, but he didn't fit well in this brigade, so he joined Liwa Ali Al Akbar and this is where his skills began to show. He had 384 confirmed kills.

Death
According to the Popular Mobilization Forces spokesman, al-Salihi was killed as he advanced on Hawija in Iraq. His funeral took place on 30 September 2017.

See also

 Abu Azrael
 Harith al-Sudani
 Salam Jassem Hussein

References

1953 births 
2017 deaths 
Iraqi military personnel killed in action
Iraqi military personnel of the Iran–Iraq War 
Iraqi Shia Muslims
Members of the Popular Mobilization Forces
Military snipers 
Military personnel of the Gulf War
Military personnel of the Iraq War
People of the Yom Kippur War
People of the War in Iraq (2013–2017)